Medicago laciniata is a plant species of the genus Medicago. It is found primarily in the southern Mediterranean basin. It forms a symbiotic relationship with the bacterium Sinorhizobium meliloti, which is capable of nitrogen fixation. Common names include cutleaf medick and tattered medick. Grows in Sinai, Egypt.

Gallery

References

External links
 International Legume Database & Information Services

laciniata
Taxa named by Philip Miller

Flora of Lebanon and Syria